Jonathan, Johnathan, or Jon Williams may refer to:

Arts and entertainment
 Jonathan Williams (antiquary) (died 1829), Welsh antiquary
 Jonathan Williams (poet) (1929–2008), American poet, publisher, essayist, and photographer
 Jonathan Williams (horn player) (born 1957), British horn player
 Jonathan Williams (pianist) (born 1974), American pianist, songwriter and vocalist
 Jonathan Williams (filmmaker), Canadian web series creator, writer and director
 Jon Williams, video game programmer, creator of Jet-Boot Jack
 A pseudonym used by science fiction author Walter Jon Williams when writing historical fiction

Sports

Basketball
Johnathan Williams (born 1995), American basketball player who has played in the NBA
 Jonathan Williams (basketball, born 1995), American basketball player who played in college at Toledo
 Jonathan Williams (basketball, born 1996), American basketball player who played in college at VCU

Gridiron football
 Jon Williams (running back, born 1961), American football player
 Jonathan Williams (running back, born 1988), American football player
 Jonathan Williams (running back, born 1994), American football player
 Jonathan Williams (defensive lineman) (born 1985), professional Canadian football defensive lineman

Other sports
 Jonathan Williams (runner) (born 1983), American runner who has represented Belize
 Jonny Williams (born 1993), Wales international footballer
 Jonathan Williams (racing driver) (1942–2014), Formula 1 driver

Other
 Jonathan Williams (engineer) (1751–1815), American businessman, military figure, politician, writer and engineer
 Jonathan Williams (priest) (born 1960), Welsh Anglican priest
 Jonathan "Caveman" Williams, person killed in the 2003 John McDonogh High School shooting

See also
 John Williams (disambiguation)